Yana Yuryevna Zhilinskayte (born 6 March 1989) is a Russian handball player for Handball Club Lada and the Russian national team. She is the twin sister of Victoria Zhilinskayte.

She participated at the 2016 European Women's Handball Championship.

References

External links

1989 births
Living people
Russian female handball players
Russian people of Lithuanian descent